The 1995–96 UC Irvine Anteaters men's basketball team represented the University of California, Irvine during the 1995–96 NCAA Division I men's basketball season. The Anteaters were led by fifth year head coach Rod Baker and played at the Bren Events Center and were members of the Big West Conference. They finished with their best record and only winning season under Rod Baker. Baker would win the Conference coach of the year.

Previous season 
The 1994–95 UC Irvine Anteaters men's basketball team finished the season with a record of 13–16, 6–12 in Big West play.

Roster

Schedule

|-
!colspan=9 style=|Regular Season

|-
!colspan=9 style=| Big West Conference tournament

Source

Awards and honors
Rod Baker
Conference Coach of the Year
Raimonds Miglinieks
Conference Player of the Year
Big West First Team All-Conference
Brian Keefe
Big West Second Team All-Conference
Kevin Simmons
Big West Second Team All-Conference
Clay McKnight
Big West All-Freshman Team

Source:

References

UC Irvine Anteaters men's basketball seasons
UC Irvine
UC Irvine Anteaters
UC Irvine Anteaters